Natural beauty may refer to:

 The general concept of beauty
 Area of Outstanding Natural Beauty, a designated geographic area in some British countries
 Physical attractiveness